, 1.94% of all vehicles in Luxembourg were electric. , 23% of new cars registered in Luxembourg were electric.

Government policy
, the national government offers subsidies of up to €8,000 for electric car purchases; these subsidies are scheduled to last until March 2024.

, there was one battery electric vehicle in the national governmental fleet.

Charging stations
, there were 1,344 public charging stations in Luxembourg.

, the national government subsidizes up to 50% of the cost of charging station installations in privately-owned parking lots.

References

Luxembourg
Road transport in Luxembourg